Beau Webster (born 1 December 1993) is an Australian cricketer who currently represents Tasmania and the Melbourne Stars. An allrounder, Webster is a right-handed batsman capable of bowling both right-arm off-break and medium pace.

Webster's unique ability to bowl both spin and pace was revealed during the 2020-21 Sheffield Shield season, with Webster having introduced pace bowling to his game as a new skill learned during the first lockdown period due to the COVID-19 pandemic. This skill set has resulted in Webster earning comparisons to former Test cricketers Collin Miller and Andrew Symonds.

Domestic career
Webster made his first-class debut for Tasmania against Queensland in the Sheffield Shield at Hobart in February 2014 after representing the Tasmania U-23 side. He made his List A debut for Tasmania in the 2016–17 Matador BBQs One-Day Cup on 3 October 2016. He made his Twenty20 debut for Hobart Hurricanes on 2 January 2017 in the 2016–17 Big Bash League season.

Webster became the captain of Cricket Australia XI for the 2017–18 JLT One-Day Cup. In the first match of the cup against South Australia he scored 121, his first List A century to help lead Cricket Australia XI to just the second win in the team's history. His 229-run partnership with Jake Carder was the fourth-highest second-wicket partnership in the history of Australia's domestic List A competition. He was named the player of the match for his efforts. He again top scored for Cricket Australia XI against Western Australia with 52, but after he was dismissed, the team suffered a major batting collapse and lost by 9 wickets. He was Cricket Australia XI's top run scorer for the cup with 247 runs at an average of 41.16.

In 2020, he decided to take advantage of his height by bowling medium pace, utilizing extra bounce on his deliveries.

References

External links
 

1993 births
Living people
Australian cricketers
Tasmania cricketers
Hobart Hurricanes cricketers
Melbourne Renegades cricketers
Melbourne Stars cricketers
Cricketers from Hobart